The 2015–16 I liga is the 8th season of the Polish I liga under its current title, and the 68th season of the second highest division in the Polish football league system since its establishment in 1949. The league is operated by the Polish Football Association (PZPN). The league is contested by 18 teams. The regular season was played in a round-robin tournament. The season began on 1 August 2015, and concluded on 6 June 2016. After the 19th matchday the league will be on winter break between 6 December 2015 and 3 March 2016.

According to the competition rules, all clubs are required to field at least one youth player (born on 1995 or later and Polish or trained in Poland) in every game (except for the times when the only youth player on the roster is sent off or unable to continue playing).

Changes from last season
The following teams have changed division since the 2014–15 season.

To I Liga
Promoted from II liga
 MKS Kluczbork
 Zagłębie Sosnowiec
 Rozwój Katowice
Relegated from Ekstraklasa
 Zawisza Bydgoszcz
 GKS Bełchatów

From I Liga
Relegated to II liga
 GKS Tychy
Promoted to Ekstraklasa
 Zagłębie Lubin
 Termalica Bruk-Bet Nieciecza

Team overview

Stadiums and locations

 Pogoń Siedlce played autumn round (8 home games) at Stadion Znicza (cap. 2,150) in Pruszków.
 Rozwój Katowice played autumn round (11 home games) at their own Stadion Rozwoju (cap. 2,472).

League table

Results

I liga play-off
The 15th place team from the regular season will compete in a play-off with the 4th place team from II liga. Matches will be played 11 and 19 June 2016. The winner will compete in the I liga. Host of first match was decided on 6 June 2016.

On 9 June 2016 Zawisza Bydgoszcz did not receive a license for the 2016–17 season, thus relegation play-off between the 15th-placed team of I liga (MKS Kluczbork) and the 4th-placed team of II liga (Wisła Puławy) was not held and both will play in the 2016–17 I liga.

Top goalscorers

References 

2015–16 in Polish football
Poland
I liga seasons